Mayogon is a village in Madaya Township in Pyin Oo Lwin District in the Mandalay Division of central Myanmar. It lies just north Mandalay city and several kilometres south-west of Madaya town.

References

External links
Maplandia World Gazetteer

Populated places in Pyin Oo Lwin District
Madaya Township